Glen Ogle (Scottish Gaelic: Gleann Ogail) extends 7 miles north westwards from Lochearnhead to Lix Toll, where it opens into Glen Dochart.

The Ogle Burn flows within the steep sides of the glen, from the Lochan Lairig Cheile at the glen's head.

The military road, which can be seen from the modern road, was built in 1749 by Major William Caulfeild. It was used by the British Army in its efforts to pacify the Highlands after the Jacobite rising of 1745.

Climate
Glen Ogle has a subpolar oceanic climate (Köppen climate classification: Cfc), colder compared to most of the United Kingdom, which mostly features an oceanic climate (Köppen climate classification: Cfb).

Railway walk
It is possible to walk through the glen on a footpath that follows the course of the former Callander and Oban Railway to the summit of the glen and Killin Junction. The original design was for 20 arches, but the bridge was built with 12 stone arches.

References 

Ogle
Valleys of Stirling (council area)